Muhammed Gümüşkaya (born 1 January 2001) is a Turkish professional footballer who plays as a midfielder for Belgian club Westerlo.

Professional career
On 26 June 2020, Gümüşkaya signed a professional contract with Fenerbahçe. He made his professional debut with the club in a 3–1 win over Çaykur Rizespor on 25 July 2020. He scored his first goal on 20 August 2021, in a 1-0 win against Finnish club HJK in the play-off round of the 2021–22 UEFA Europa League.

On 4 February 2022, Gümüşkaya was loaned to Süper Lig club Giresunspor for the rest of the season.

On 23 August 2022, Gümüşkaya signed a four-year contract with Westerlo in Belgium.

International career
Gümüşkaya represented the Turkey U23s in their winning campaign at the 2021 Islamic Solidarity Games.

Career statistics

Honours
Turkey U23
Islamic Solidarity Games: 2021

References

External links
 
 
 

2001 births
Living people
Footballers from Istanbul
Association football midfielders
Turkish footballers
Turkey youth international footballers
Fenerbahçe S.K. footballers
Boluspor footballers
Giresunspor footballers
K.V.C. Westerlo players
Süper Lig players
TFF First League players
Turkish expatriate footballers
Expatriate footballers in Belgium
Turkish expatriate sportspeople in Belgium